LGBT in California can concerns the topics:
 LGBT history in California
 LGBT rights in California